is a city located in Sorachi Subprefecture, Hokkaido, Japan. It is Japan's smallest city by population.

History 
It was formerly a prosperous coal mining city, but has declined greatly since the closing of the coal mines. The population hit a maximum of 46,000 in 1948, and has been decreasing every year since.

Efforts to transform Utashinai from a gritty coal mining town to an alpine tourist destination have met with mixed success.  The town has adopted a Swiss theme as part of its tourist oriented strategy and many new buildings are Swiss chalet style.  A medium-sized ski hill, Kamoidake, attracts a decent crowd of locals and hosts frequent ski meets, while a hot spring resort called Tyrol, after the Austrian region, is known throughout Hokkaido for the quality of its water.  However, despite these new projects, Utashinai continues to experience population decline and economic stagnation.  The high school closed in 2007, with students now traveling to Sunagawa, Akabira or Takikawa for their secondary education.

Timeline
1890 - Sorachi Coal Mine opened, founding of Utashinai.
1897 - Utashinai Village split away from Nae Village (now the city of Sunagawa).
1900 - Ashibetsu Village splits off.
1906 - Utashinai becomes a Second Class Municipality.
1919 - Utashinai becomes a First Class Municipality.
1922 - Akabira Village split off.
1940 - Utashinai becomes a town.
1949 - Part of the town splits off into Kamisunagawa Town.
July 1, 1958 - Utashinai becomes a city.
1971 - Sumitomo closes Utashinai Mine.
1988 - Kamiutashinai Mine closed.
1995 - Sorachi Mine closed.
2003 - Mid-Sorachi Merger Conference established.
2004 - Merger Conference disbanded.

Geography
Penkeutashunai River, a tributary of Ishikari River, flows through Utashinai. There is Mount Kamoi on the northwest of the city.

Name
The name is derived from the Ainu ota-us-nay meaning "River connected to a sandy beach".

Demographics
As of December 31, 2020, the city had an population of 3,019, with 1,788 households, and a density of 62 persons per km2. The total area of the city is 55.99 km2. The population of Utashinai has been declining very rapidly for the past 80 years.

Culture

Mascot

He is a sheep who moved from Switzerland to Japan. He carries an alphorn. He is unveiled in 1998.

References

External links 
Official Website 

Cities in Hokkaido